This is a list of newspapers in Kazakhstan.

Newspapers
Caravan — Russian language newspaper.
Egemen Kazakhstan — Republic newspaper.
Kazakhskaya Pravda — National newspaper of Kazakhstan.
The Times of Central Asia — Independent newspaper covering Kazakhstan, Kyrgyzstan, Turkmenistan and Uzbekistan.
Vremya —  Russian language newspaper.
Zonakz — Online newspaper Russian language.
Vechernii Almaty — Daily official city newspaper in Almaty. Published in Russian language.
Diapazon — Independent socio-political newspaper of Aktobe.
Liter — Republican socio-political newspaper of Kazakhstan. 
Akmolinskaya Pravda — Social and political newspaper.
Kursiv — Republican business weekly.
Biznes and vlast — Business newspaper.
Vechernyaya Astana — Socio-political, information newspaper. 
Delovoy Kazakhstan — Republican economic newspaper.
Kapital — Business weekly.
Novaya Gazeta. Kazakhstan — Russian language newspaper.
Express-K — Republican socio-political newspaper.

Magazines 
Forbes — Business magazine.
Banki Kazakhstana — Financial magazine.
Exclusive — Review and Analytical magazine.

News agencies
Ak Zhaik — News service English/Kazakh/Russian language .
Khabar — State news agency.
Tengrinews.kz — Information portal of Kazakhstan English/Kazakh/Russian languages.
Kazakh TV — Kazakh TV news service, English/Kazakh/Russian languages.
Bnews — News in Kazahstan English/Kazakh/Russian languages.
Kazinform — International news agency English/Kazakh/Russian languages.
Astana Times — International news from Astana Times English/Kazakh/Russian languages.
Interfax Kazakhstan — Information Agency Interfax Kazakhstan English/Kazakh/Russian languages.
Qazaqstan — Kazakhstan state television channel English/Kazakh/Russian languages.
Kazakhstan Today — Information portal of Kazakhstan English/Kazakh/Russian languages.
Total — Information portal of Kazakhstan Kazakh/Russian languages.
Aqparat — Information portal of Kazakhstan Kazakh/Russian languages.
Zakon — Information portal of Kazakhstan Kazakh/Russian languages.
365info — Information portal of Kazakhstan Kazakh/Russian languages.
Baq.KZ— Informational portal of Kazakhstan.
Informburo — Kazakhstan news, Kazakh/Russian languages.
NUR — Informational portal of Kazakhstan.
LS — Information Agency of Kazakhstan.

Other news sources
Embassy of Kazakhstan to the US and Canada — up-to-date information on recent developments, as well as history, culture and traditions, of Kazakhstan; includes information about getting visas

See also
 Media of Kazakhstan

Kazakhstan
 
Newspapers
Kazakh-language mass media